Beers may refer to:

 plural of beer, an alcoholic beverage
 Beers (surname)
 Beers, Friesland, a Dutch place in the Friesland municipality of Littenseradiel
 Beers, North Brabant, a Dutch place in the North Brabant municipality of Cuijk
 De Beers, a Johannesburg-based diamond mining and trading corporation
 Beers criteria, Beers Criteria for Potentially Inappropriate Medication Use in Older Adults

See also
 Beer (disambiguation)